Rollin', released in 1974, was the first full-length album by Scotland's Bay City Rollers.  The album included three British chart hits ("Remember", "Shang-a-Lang", "Summerlove Sensation") and the debut of "Saturday Night", never a British hit yet a No. 1 smash in America, later.

While the album itself was not released in America, several of the songs would later appear on the band's self-titled U.S. debut.

Track listing

Side one
"Shang-a-Lang" (Phil Coulter, Bill Martin) – 3:07 
"Give It to Me Now" (Coulter, Martin) – 3:48 
"Angel Angel" (Eric Faulkner, Stuart "Woody" Wood) – 2:27 
"Be My Baby" (Jeff Barry, Ellie Greenwich, Phil Spector) – 3:27 
"Just a Little Love" (Faulkner, Wood) – 2:57 
"Remember (Sha-La-La-La)" (Coulter, Martin) – 2:33

Side two
"Saturday Night" (Coulter, Martin) – 2:57 
"Ain't It Strange" (Faulkner, Wood, Les McKeown) – 2:10 
"Please Stay" (Burt Bacharach, Bob Hilliard) – 3:54 
"Jenny Gotta Dance" (Coulter, Martin) – 3:06 
"There Goes My Baby" (Faulkner, Wood) – 3:18 
"Summerlove Sensation" (Coulter, Martin) – 3:12

2004 UK reissue
A 2004 CD reissue on Bell included four bonus tracks:  "Are You Ready for That Rock and Roll" (the original B-side of the "Shang-a-Lang" single); "Bringing Back the Good Times" (B-side of "Summerlove Sensation"); "Bye Bye Barbara" (B-side of "Remember"); and "Hey C.B." (B-side of "Saturday Night").
Strange, then, that it didn't include the original single versions of "Saturday Night" and "Remember" as well, which both featured different (first) lead vocalist Nobby Clark. And yet another credible contender for an extra track would be the U.S. single and album version of "Summerlove Sensation" (w/strings) – not to mention final Martin/Coulter-penned 45 "All of Me Loves All of You" / "The Bump", which, however, appeared as an extra material on the "Once Upon a Star" CD issue.

Personnel
Musicians
Les McKeown – vocals, guitar
Eric Faulkner – guitar, violin, mandolin, bass
Stuart Wood "Woody"– guitar, bass, piano, mandolin
Alan Longmuir – bass, accordion, piano
Derek Longmuir – drums, congas, tambourine

Production
Phil Coulter: arrangement and production
Bill Martin: production

Charts

Weekly charts

Year-end charts

References

Bay City Rollers albums
1974 debut albums
Albums produced by Phil Coulter
Albums produced by Bill Martin (musician)
Bell Records albums